Green White Green is a coming of age film revolving around three teenagers, who seem on an interminably long wait for university.

Plot
Three teenagers seem to be on an interminably long wait for university. In the hiatus, they carry on with various shenanigans. Uzzie tries his hand on becoming an artist, his friend Segun keeps a bag packed for an always impending trip to New York and the other one tries to make his father believe in and respect him.

Their 'lounging and chilling' sessions help the audience understand what drives the average young Nigerian; the audience sees the American and hip hop influence, the Boko Haram issue, the hankering after 'going abroad' and the lack of direction that sometimes leads young people down the wrong path.

A group of Ajegunle boys are described as 'Future Thugs' and one of them actually looks in the camera and says – 'Make you look me o, I no well o' which sort of sums up the mental state of many young Nigerians driven half-mad by disillusion and the mess their parents have made of the country.

Green White Green is produced and directed by Abba Makama. It stars Ifeanyi Dike, Samuel Robinson and Jammal Ibrahim.

Cast 
 Ifeanyi Dike as Uzoma
 Jammal Ibrahim as Baba
 Samuel Robinson as Segun
Crystabel Goddy as Maggie

Release 
Green White Green was released in Nigeria on 30 September 2016 at the Lights Camera Africa Film Festival in Lagos, following a screening at the Toronto International Film Festival.

Reception 
Green White Green has received good critical reviews and has been described as "scrappy and clever" by Now Toronto, "Meta-Nollywood" by Screen Daily, "a kaleidoscopic exploration of Nigeria's history" by New Telegraph, "daring, wild and seemingly fun" by Indie Wire, "Bold and Brash" by Variety and "A Jagajaga film" by Sabi News.

References

External links
 

2016 films
English-language Nigerian films
Films set in Nigeria
Films shot in Nigeria
2010s English-language films
Nigerian coming-of-age films